The Louis Calder Center is Fordham University's biological field station.

History 
The Louis Calder Center was founded in 1967 when paper magnate Louis Calder donated his  estate to Fordham University. Buildings have since been constructed, renovated, and modernized.

Buildings 
The Louis Calder Center consists of 19 buildings including:
Calder Hall - A 27-room stone mansion which houses seminar rooms, a library, herbarium, insect collection, guest rooms, kitchen, and dining room.
McCarthy Laboratories - a building where a great amount of the analysis of samples is carried out. The lab includes growth chambers, a nutrient autoanalyzer, gas chromatograph, HPLC, carbon-nitrogen analyzer, fluorescence and phase microscopes, spectrophotometers, autoclaves, electronic balances, refrigerators, centrifuges, and other scientific equipment.
Greenhouses
Lakeside Lodge
Routh House

Calder Lake 
Calder Lake is a 4 hectare mesoeutrophic lake located within the Louis Calder Center. The lake bottom is more than half covered by a submersed macrophyte community, including Vallisneria americana, Elodea canadensis, Potamogeton amplifolius, and Najas flexilis. Since Calder Lake is relatively small, the surrounding flora (including Quercus rubra, Quercus prinus, Acer rubrum, Fagus grandifolia, and Cornus florida) plays a significant role in its ecology, as falling leaves add nutrients to the water. The production rates of bacteria and larger phytoplankton in the lake are limited by the supply of inorganic phosphorus. Dissolved organic carbon exists between 4–6 mg C/L in the lake.

External links
Official Website

Fordham University
Protected areas of Westchester County, New York
Nature reserves in New York (state)
Buildings and structures in Westchester County, New York
1967 establishments in New York (state)